Sheridan Technical High School is an all-magnet school in Fort Lauderdale, Florida and a part of Broward County Public Schools.

It opened in August 2014 in the former Sunset Learning Center.

Demographics
As of the 2021–22 school year, the total student enrollment was 527. The ethnic makeup of the school was 56.4% White, 35.9% Black, 42.3% Hispanic, 3.4% Asian, 3.2% Multiracial, 1.1% Native American or Native Alaskan, and 0% Native Hawaiian or Pacific Islander. Note that the adult enrollment in this school is not reflected in the total student enrollment number.

References

External links
 Sheridan Technical High School

High schools in Fort Lauderdale, Florida
2014 establishments in Florida
Magnet schools in Florida
Educational institutions established in 2014
Public high schools in Florida